The Gandalf Awards, honoring achievement in fantasy literature, were conferred by the World Science Fiction Society annually from 1974 to 1981. They were named for Gandalf the wizard, from the Middle-earth stories by J. R. R. Tolkien. The award was created and sponsored by Lin Carter and the Swordsmen and Sorcerers' Guild of America (SAGA), an association of fantasy writers. Recipients were selected by vote of participants in the World Science Fiction Conventions according to procedures of the older Hugo Awards.

The awards were presented in two categories, for life achievement and for a book published during the preceding year. Their primary purpose continues to be fulfilled by two of the once-rival World Fantasy Awards, first presented in 1975—specifically the World Fantasy Award for Life Achievement and World Fantasy Award for Best Novel.

Gandalf Grand Master Award
The Gandalf Grand Master Award for life achievement in fantasy writing was awarded every year from 1974 to 1981. The inaugural winner was J. R. R. Tolkien, recently deceased (1973).

The next four Grand Masters were all members of the SAGA: Fritz Leiber, L. Sprague de Camp, Andre Norton, and Poul Anderson. The last three were Ursula K. Le Guin, Ray Bradbury, and C. L. Moore. 

 1974: J. R. R. Tolkien
 1975: Fritz Leiber
 1976: L. Sprague de Camp
 1977: Andre Norton
 1978: Poul Anderson
 1979: Ursula K. Le Guin
 1980: Ray Bradbury
 1981: C. L. Moore

There was no ballot in 1981. All other winners since Tolkien were among the five or six finalists one year earlier. Others who appeared on the ballot were C. S. Lewis, Jack Vance, Roger Zelazny, Marion Zimmer Bradley, Anne McCaffrey, and Patricia McKillip.

Gandalf Award for Book-Length Fantasy
The Gandalf Award for Book-Length Fantasy was awarded only in 1978 and 1979. Again the inaugural winner was Tolkien. The second was The White Dragon by Anne McCaffrey. Fantasy fiction often wins the older Hugo Award for Best Novel, so Worldcon organizers considered the Gandalf to be partly a duplicate and it was not awarded again.

 1978: The Silmarillion, J. R. R. Tolkien, edited by Christopher Tolkien
 1979: The White Dragon, Anne McCaffrey

See also
Swordsmen and Sorcerers' Guild of America
World Fantasy Award

Notes

Fantasy awards
Things named after Tolkien works
Worldcon